Salhi or al-Salhi with the Arabic definite article "al" may refer to:

People
 Abdelkader Salhi (footballer) (born 1993), Algerian footballer
 Abdelkader Salhi (serial killer), known as The 10 Killer, a suspected German serial killer 
 Bassam as-Salhi, Palestinian politician
 Hafid Salhi (born 1993), Dutch footballer 
 Mohammed Al-Salhi, Saudi athlete
 Nabil Salhi (born 1971), Tunisian wrestler
 Radhouane Salhi, Tunisian footballer
 Toafik Salhi, Tunisian footballer
 Yassin Salhi, French domestic terrorist in the Saint-Quentin-Fallavier attack 
 Yassine Salhi (footballer, born 1987), Moroccan football forward
 Yassine Salhi (footballer, born 1989), Tunisian football midfielder
 Yassine Salhi (footballer, born 1992), Algerian football defender playing for CS Constantine

Other uses
 Salhi (region), a region/city-state in the vicinity of Ugarit 
 Salhi (music), a Tunisian genre of music 

Arabic-language surnames